Jose Kusugak (2 May 1950 – 18 or 19 January 2011) was an Inuk politician from Repulse Bay, Northwest Territories (now Naujaat, Nunavut), Canada. He moved, along with his family, to Rankin Inlet in 1960.

Kusugak was born in Repulse Bay. After attending school in both Chesterfield Inlet and Churchill, Manitoba he went to Saskatoon, Saskatchewan to attend high school. After finishing high school he went on to teach in both Rankin Inlet and Churchill, where he taught Inuktitut and Inuit history.

In 1971 he joined what was then called the Inuit Tapirisat of Canada, known today as the Inuit Tapiriit Kanatami (ITK), and served as an assistant to Tagak Curley the organization's first president. Later moving to Arviat he helped to establish a standardized writing system for Inuktitut syllabics.

In 1979/1980 he joined the Canadian Broadcasting Corporation as the area manager for the Kivalliq Region. After working with them for 10 years, he joined the Inuit Broadcasting Corporation, and introduced several new areas of programming to the network. He then became the president of Nunavut Tunngavik Incorporated, one of the four organizations that make up the ITK.

As president of NTI he was responsible for negotiating the comprehensive land claims for Inuit, including the creation of Nunavut, with the governments of Canada and the Northwest Territories. In acknowledgement of this work, he has been called the "Last Father of Confederation." The new territory was proclaimed on April 1, 1999, five days before Kusugak's eldest daughter Aliisa Autut, gave birth to her third child.

Kusugak held the position of president until losing the election to Paul Kaludjuak after which he was controversially appointed president of ITK. After 6 years as president, Kusugak announced on 12 May 2006 that he was stepping down.

Kusugak wrote the short comic Kiviuq vs Big Bee that was published in the anthology Arctic Comics in 2016.

Kusugak was married to the acting Commissioner of Nunavut, Nellie Kusugak. Kusugak died in Rankin Inlet, Kivalliq, Nunavut, Canada. He was commemorated on a Canadian stamp in 2022, as the first in a series of three indigenous leaders on stamps.

References

External links and references
Profile at the CBC
Library and Archives Canada profile
Nunatsiaq News report on Kusugak's resignation
Nunatsiaq News, Jose Kusugak, Nunavut's Cheerful Muse

1950 births
2011 deaths
Inuit from the Northwest Territories
Inuit politicians
Politicians in Nunavut
People from Rankin Inlet
People from Arviat
People from Churchill, Manitoba
Inuit from Nunavut